Saint Hermenegild or Ermengild (died 13 April 585; ; , from Gothic *Airmana-gild, "immense tribute"), was the son of king Liuvigild of the Visigothic Kingdom in the Iberian Peninsula and southern France. He fell out with his father in 579, then revolted the following year. During his rebellion, he converted from Arianism to Catholicism. Hermenegild was defeated in 584 and exiled. His death was later celebrated as a martyrdom due to the influence of Pope Gregory I's Dialogues, in which he portrayed Hermenegild as a "Catholic martyr rebelling against the tyranny of an Arian father."

Marriage to Ingund
Hermenegild was the eldest son of Liuvigild and his first wife. He was a brother of Reccared I and brought up an Arian. Liuvigild made his sons co-regents.

In 579, he married Ingund, the daughter of the Frankish King Sigebert I of Austrasia who was a Catholic. Her mother was the Visigoth princess Brunhilda of Austrasia. The twelve-year-old Ingund was pressured by Hermenegild's stepmother Goiswintha to abjure her beliefs, but she stayed firm in her faith.

Liuvigild sent Hermenegild to the south to govern on his behalf. There, he came under the influence of Leander of Seville, the older brother of Isidore of Seville. Hermenegild was converted to Chalcedonian Christianity. His family demanded for him to return to Arianism, but he refused.

Around then, he led a revolt against Liuvigild. Contemporary accounts attribute that to politics, rather than primarily religious differences. He asked for the aid of the Byzantine Empire, but it was occupied with defending itself from territorial incursions by the Sasanian Empire. For a time, Hermenegild had the support of the Suebi, who had been defeated by Liuvigild in 579, but he forced them to capitulate once again in 583.

Hermenegild fled to Seville and when it fell to a siege in 584, he went to Córdoba. After Liuvigild paid 30,000 pieces of gold, the Byzantines withdrew and took Ingund and her son with them.

Hermenegild sought sanctuary in a church. Liuvigild would not violate the sanctuary. He sent Reccared inside to speak with Hermenegild and to offer peace. That was accepted, and peace was made for some time.

Imprisonment and death
Goiswintha, however, brought about another alienation within the family. Hermenegild was imprisoned in Tarragona or Toledo. During his captivity in the tower of Seville, an Arian bishop was sent to Hermenegild for Easter but he would not accept the Eucharist from him. King Liuvigild ordered him beheaded; he was executed on 13 April 585.

He had one son by his wife named Athanagild after his matrilineal great-grandfather king Athanagild. They both tried to seek refuge in Constantinople after his execution, but it was refused while they were already in Sicily. She then returned to the Frankish Kingdom, where her son remained under her and her mother's custody.

Parentage
According to the 9th-century Chronicle of Alfonso III, Erwig was the son of Ardabast, who had journeyed from the Byzantine Empire to Hispania during the time of Chindasuinth, and married Chindasuinth's niece Goda. Ardabast (or Artavasdos), was probably an Armenian or Persian Christian exile in Constantinople or in Byzantine Africa. In Hispania he was made a count. 

17th-century Spanish genealogist Luis Bartolomé de Salazar y Castro gave Ardabast's father as Athanagild, the son of Saint Hermenegild and Ingund, and his mother as Flavia Juliana, a daughter of Peter Augustus and niece of the Emperor Maurice. This imperial connection is disputed by Christian Settipani, who says that the only source for Athanagild's marriage to Flavia Julia is José Pellicer, who he claims to be a forger.

See also
 Saint Hermenegild, patron saint archive

Footnotes

Sources

External links

 Lives of the Saints: April 13 St. Hermenegild, Martyr
 Saint Hermenegild engraved by L. Beck, from De Verda collection
Saint Hermenegild, Martyr at the Christian Iconography web site

585 deaths
Converts to Catholicism from Arianism
Medieval Spanish saints
6th-century people of the Visigothic Kingdom
6th-century Christian saints
Roman Catholic royal saints
Christian royal saints
Year of birth unknown
Executed Spanish people
Christian martyrs executed by decapitation
Heirs apparent who never acceded